The river Sado is a river in southern Portugal; it is one of the major rivers in the country. It flows in a northerly direction (the only major Portuguese river to do so) through  from its springs in the hills of Ourique before entering the Atlantic Ocean in an estuary in the city of Setúbal.

The estuary is the habitat of a large community of bottlenose dolphins; there are 31 members of the pod, each of whom has been named (2007).

The river is dammed in several places, chiefly for irrigation of rice, maize, and other vegetables.

In its course, the river crosses the city of Alcácer do Sal.

References

Rivers of Portugal